Fan Expo Boston, formerly Boston Comic Con, is a multigenre convention held annually in Boston, MA. Primarily focused on comic books, the convention later featured media guests from film and television, cosplayers, an art auction, a tabletop/CCG/RPG gaming room, and an annual costume contest.

History

Founded on March 18, 2007 as a one-day show at the Back Bay Events Center, Boston Comic Con has grown each year and subsequently expanded to two days in 2009 and three days in 2014. The convention moved to the Westin Waterfront Hotel in 2010 and the Hynes Convention Center in 2011. Following a cancellation in April 2013 due to the Boston Marathon bombing, Boston Comic Con relocated to the Seaport Hotel and Seaport World Trade Center in South Boston's seaport district. Immediately following the 2016 convention it was announced that the convention had been sold to London-based Informa, producers of the Fan Expo line of conventions, and would be moving in 2017 to the nearby Boston Convention and Exhibition Center. Despite advertising the 2017 convention as BCC's 10th anniversary, the convention opened as "Fan Expo Boston", with the Comic Con name effectively retired from 2018 onward.

Event history

Notable Events
Chef Paul Wahlberg filmed a segment of his reality show Wahlburgers (episode six of season three) at Boston Comic Con on Friday, August 1, 2014 which aired on Wednesday, February 11, 2015.

Guests Manu Bennett, Jimmy Palmiotti, Amanda Conner, Brian Azzarello and more appeared alongside several cosplayers at Fenway Park for the Boston Red Sox's inaugural "Boston Comic Con Night" on July 30, 2015.

Mayor Marty Walsh appeared on August 1, 2015 to declare Stan Lee Day in Boston in honor of Stan Lee's appearance at Boston Comic Con.

References

External links
Fan Expo Boston Website

Recurring events established in 2007
2007 establishments in Massachusetts
Comics conventions in the United States
Multigenre conventions
Conventions in Massachusetts